Yenipazar, which means "new market place" in Turkish, is the actual or historical name of several localities. It may refer to:

People
 Murat Yenipazar (born 1993), Turkish volleyball player

Places
 Novi Pazar is a city, notable during the Ottoman period when it took the name, in today's Serbia
 Yenipazar, Aydın is a district and its central town in Aydın Province in western Turkey
 Yenipazar, Bilecik is a district and its central town in Bilecik Province in north-western Turkey